This is a list of Roman legions, including key facts about each legion, primarily focusing on the Principate (early Empire, 27 BC – 284 AD) legions, for which there exists substantial literary, epigraphic and archaeological evidence.

When Augustus became sole ruler in 31 BC, he disbanded about half of the over 50 legions then in existence. The remaining 28 legions became the core of the early Imperial army of the Principate (27 BC – AD 284), most lasting over three centuries. Augustus and his immediate successors transformed legions into permanent units, staffed by entirely career soldiers on standard 25-year terms.

During the Dominate period (near the end of the Empire, 284–476), legions were also professional, but are little understood due to scarcity of evidence compared to the Principate. What is clear is that late legions were radically different in size, structure, and tactical role from their predecessors, despite several retaining early period names. This was the result of the military reforms of Emperors Diocletian and Constantine I, and of further developments during the 4th century.

The legions were identified by Roman numerals, though the spelling sometimes differed from the modern standard. For example, in addition to the spellings "IV", "IX", "XIV", "XVIII" and "XIX", the respective spellings "IIII", "VIIII", "XIIII", "XIIX" and "XVIIII" were commonly used.  Legions also bore a cognomen or nickname.  While neither a legion's number or cognomen were likely unique enough to identify it, the combination of the two is usually needed to identify a specific legion.  For example, both Legio III Cyrenaica and Legio III Gallica were distinct, long-standing legions of the late Republic and Imperial periods.  To visually identify legions, they also bore a specific emblem, a symbolic representation of the legion, frequently an animal or mythological figure, which appeared on the vexillum, a small rectangular flag that served as the legion's standard and carried both the emblem and name of the legion.

Late Republican legions

Until the Marian reforms of 107 BC, the Republican legions were formed by compulsory levy of Roman citizens (who met a minimum property qualification) and raised whenever it was necessary. Usually they were authorized by the Roman Senate, and were later disbanded.

Gaius Marius' reforms transformed legions into standing units, which could remain in being for several years, or even decades. This became necessary to garrison the Republic's now far-flung territories. Legionaries started large-scale recruiting of volunteer soldiers enlisted for a minimum term of six years and a fixed salary, although conscription was still practiced. The property requirements were abolished by Marius, so that the bulk of recruits were henceforth from the landless citizens, who would be most attracted to the paid employment and land offered after their service.

In the last century of the Republic, proconsuls governing frontier provinces became increasingly powerful. Their command of standing legions in distant and arduous military campaigns resulted in the allegiance of those units transferring from the Roman state to themselves. These imperatores (lit: victorious generals, from the title imperator they were hailed with by their troops) frequently fell out with each other and started civil wars to seize control of the state, such as Sulla, Caesar, Pompey, Crassus, Mark Antony and Octavian (later Augustus, the first Emperor himself). In this context, the imperatores raised many legions that were not authorised by the Senate, sometimes having to use their own resources. As civil wars were resolved, many of these "private" units would be disbanded, only for more to be raised to fight the next civil war. By the time Augustus emerged as sole ruler of Rome in 31 BC, over 50 legions were in existence, many of which were disbanded.

The legions included in the following list had a long enough history to be somehow remarkable. Most of them were levied by Julius Caesar and later included into Octavian's army, some of them were levied by Marc Antony.

 Legio I Germanica (Germanic): 48 BC – AD 70 (Revolt of the Batavi), Julius Caesar
 Legio II Sabina (Sabine): 43 BC – , early name of the Legio II Augusta
 Legio III Cyrenaica (from Cyrene): probably  to (at least) the 5th century, Mark Antony
 Legio III Gallica (Gallic): around 49 BC to at least early 4th century, Julius Caesar (emblem: bull)
 Legio IV Macedonica (Macedonian): 48 BC – AD 70 (renamed by Vespasian), Julius Caesar (emblem: bull, capricorn)
 Legio IV Scythica (from Scythia):  to at least early 5th century, Mark Antony (emblem: capricorn)
 Legio V Alaudae (Larks): 52 BC – AD 70 or 86 (destroyed either during the Batavian rebellion or by the Dacians in first Battle of Tapae), Julius Caesar (emblem: elephant)
 Legio VI Ferrata (Ironclad): 52 BC – after 250, Julius Caesar (emblem: bull, she-wolf and Romulus and Remus); twin legion of Legio VI Victrix
 Legio VI Victrix (Victorious): 41 BC – after 402, Octavian (emblem: bull)
 Legio VII Claudia Pia Fidelis (loyal and faithful to Claudius): 51 BC – 44 BC, Julius Caesar; disbanded and re-formed by Vespasian as Legio VII Gemina
 Legio VIII Augusta: 59 BC – 48 BC, Julius Caesar, disbanded and re-enlisted by Augustus as Legio VIII Augusta
 Legio IX Hispana Triumphalis (Triumphant): 59 BC – 48 BC, Julius Caesar, disbanded and re-enlisted by Augustus as Legio IX Hispana
 Legio X Fretensis (of the sea strait): levied by Augustus in 41–40 BC
 Legio X Equestris (Equestrian): before 58 BC – 45 BC, Julius Caesar's personal legion
 Legio XI Claudia: 58 BC – 45 BC, Julius Caesar (emblem: Neptune), disbanded, reconstituted by Augustus
 Legio XII Victrix (Victorious): 57 BC – AD 45, Julius Caesar
 Legio XII Fulminata (Thunderbolt): after being renamed by Augustus, first reconstituted by Lepidus in 43 BC, named by Mark Antony as Legio XII Antiqua (Ancient)
 Legio XIII Gemina (Twin): 57 BC – 45 BC: Julius Caesar, later (41 BC) reconstituted by Augustus. The legion that crossed the Rubicon with Caesar on his assault on Rome.
 Legio XIV Gemina (Twin): 57 BC – 48 BC: Julius Caesar, destroyed and reconstituted in 53 BC. Reconstituted by Augustus after 41 BC
 Legio XVII Classica (Of the Fleet): raised by Mark Antony, disbanded in 31 BC by Octavian following his victory at the Battle of Actium.
 Legio XVIII Libyca (from Libya): raised by Mark Antony, disbanded in 31 BC by Octavian following his victory at the Battle of Actium.
 Legio XIX: raised by Mark Antony, disbanded in 31 BC by Octavian following his victory at the Battle of Actium.
 Legio XX Siciliana: raised by Octavian for the purpose of launching an invasion of Sicily in 36 BC, which at the time was held by Sextus Pompeius.
 : 49 BC – 42 BC, Julius Caesar, destroyed in 42 BC while crossing the Adriatic during the Liberators' civil war.
 : 47 BC – 31 BC, Julius Caesar
 : 49 BC – 30 BC, Julius Caesar
  (Naval): 48 BC – 41 BC, Julius Caesar

Early Empire legions

Codes for Roman provinces in the table:

{|
|AEG||Aegyptus||(Egypt)
|-
|AFR||Africa||(Tunisia/Western Libya)
|-
|AQ||Aquitania||(SW France)
|-
|AR||Arabia Petraea||(Jordan/Sinai)
|-
|BRIT||Britannia||(England/Wales)
|-
|CAP||Cappadocia||(Central/Eastern Turkey)
|-
|DC||Dacia||(Romania/Serbia)
|-
|DLM||Dalmatia||(Bosnia-Herzegovina/Croatia/Montenegro/Kosovo/Serbia)
|-
|GAL||Galatia||(Central Turkey)
|-
|GI||Germania Inferior||(Netherlands/Rhineland)
|-
|GS||Germania Superior||(Alsace-Lorraine/Rhineland)
|-
|HISP||Hispania Tarraconensis||(Central Spain)
|-
|IT||Italia||(Italy)
|-
|JUD||Judaea||(Israel/Palestine)
|-
|MAUR||Mauretania||(Western Maghreb)
|-
|MCD||Macedonia||(Southern Balkans/Greece)
|-
|MI||Moesia Inferior||(Romania/Bulgaria)
|-
|MS||Moesia Superior||(Serbia)
|-
|NR||Noricum||(Austria)
|-
|PAN||Pannonia||(Hungary/Slovakia/Croatia/Slovenia)
|-
|RT||Raetia||(Switzerland/Germany)
|-
|SYR||Syria||(Syria/Lebanon)
|}

Legend

Legion number and title (cognomen)
The numbering of the legions is confusing, since several legions shared the same number with others. Augustus numbered the legions he founded himself from I, but also inherited numbers from his predecessors. Each emperor normally numbered the legions he raised himself starting from I. However, even this practice was not consistently followed. For example, Vespasian kept the same numbers as before for legions he raised from disbanded units. Trajan's first legion was numbered XXX because there were 29 other legions in existence at the time it was raised; but the second Trajanic legion was given the sequential number II. XVII, XVIII and XIX, the numbers of the legions annihilated in the Teutoburg Forest, were never used again. (These three legions are without titles, suggesting that in disgrace their titles may have been deliberately forgotten or left unmentioned.) As a result of this somewhat chaotic evolution, the legion's title became necessary to distinguish between legions with the same number.

Legions often carried several titles, awarded after successive campaigns, normally by the ruling emperor e.g. XII Fulminata was also awarded: paterna (fatherly), victrix (victorious), antiqua (venerable), certa constans (reliable, steadfast) and Galliena (Gallienus '). Pia fidelis (loyal and faithful), fidelis constans and others were titles awarded to several legions, sometimes several times to the same legion. Only the most established, commonly used titles are displayed on this table.

The geographical titles indicate
 the country a legion was originally recruited e.g. Italica = from Italy or
 peoples the legion has vanquished e.g.Parthica = victorious over the Parthians
Legions bearing the personal name of an emperor, or of his gens (clan) (e.g. Augusta, Flavia) were either founded by that Emperor or awarded the name as a mark of special favour.

The title GEMINA means that two diminished legions have been combined to make one new one.

Main legionary base
This shows the castra (base) where the legion spent the longest period during the Principate. Legions often shared the same base with other legions. Detachments of legions were often seconded for lengthy periods to other bases and provinces, as operational needs demanded.

Emblem
Legions often sported more than one emblem at the same time, and occasionally changed them. Legions raised by Caesar mostly carried a bull emblem originally; those of Augustus mostly a Capricorn

Date disbanded
For legions that are documented into the 4th century and beyond, we do not know when or how they were terminated. For legions disappearing from the record before 284, the reason (certain or likely) is given as:
XX = annihilated in battle
DD = disbanded in disgrace
UF = unknown fate

Castra legionaria
Indicates the bases (castra) and/or provinces where the legion was based during its history, with dates.

Notes
Contains points of note, including explanation of titles and details of a legion's fate.

Province names and borders are assumed throughout the Principate period as at 107, during the rule of Trajan, and after the annexation of Dacia and Arabia Petraea. The map above shows provinces at the end of Trajan's reign, 117. They are the same as in 107, except that Armenia and Mesopotamia have been annexed (they were abandoned soon after Trajan's death); and Pannonia has been split into two (the split occurred ). In reality provincial borders were modified several times between 30 BC and 284: this explains any discrepancy with other sources, as to a legion's location at a particular date.

Late Empire legions 

Diocletian reorganized the Roman army, in order to better counter the threat of the Germanic peoples of northern Europe as well as that of the Persians from the East. The army was formed by border and field units.

The border (limitanei) units were to occupy the limes, the structured border fortifications, and were formed by professional soldiers with an inferior training.

The field units were to stay well behind the border, and to move quickly where they were needed, with both offensive and defensive roles. Field units were formed by elite soldiers with high-level training and weapons. They were further divided into:
 Scholae: the personal guard of the Emperor, created by Constantine I to replace the Praetorian Guard;
 Palatinae: "palace troops" were the highest ranked units, created by Constantine I after he disbanded the Praetorian Guard, it was comprised originally of former guardsmen;
 Comitatenses: regular field units, some were newly-formed, others were descended from Early-Empire legions;
 Pseudocomitatenses: these were limitanei units diverted into the field army and often kept there; some Early Empire legions became pseudocomitatenses units.

These units usually numbered between 300 and 2,000 soldiers and some of them kept their original numbering schemes.

 Legio I
I Armeniaca
 I Flavia Constantia (reliable Flavian): comitatensis unit under the command of the Magister militum per Orientis
 I Flavia Gallicana Constantia (reliable Flavian legion from Gallia): pseudocomitatensis under the command of the Magister Peditum per Gallias. The legion was founded by Constantius I Chlorus. The legions objective was to protect the Armorican coast and fight the Roman-British usurper, Allectus.
 I Flavia Martis (Flavian legion devoted to Mars): pseudocomitatensis. The legion was founded by Constantius Chlorus to fight Allectus. It was stationed in Gaul.
 I Flavia Pacis (Flavian legion of peace): comitatensis under the command of the Magister Peditum
 I Flavia Theodosiana: comitatensis.
 I Illyricorum (of the Illyrians): stationed at the Camp of Diocletian in Palmyra
 I Iovia (devoted to Jupiter): levied by Diocletian, stationed in Scythia Minor
 I Isaura Sagittaria (archers from Isauria): pseudocomitatensis under the command of the Magister militum per Orientis
 I Iulia Alpina: pseudocomitatensis under the command of the Magister Peditum in Italy. It is unknown who founded the legion although it was probably Crispus or Constans.
 I Martia possibly based near modern Kaiseraugst. The Legion could have had the surname Victrix. The legion was probably founded by Diocletian. It also may have built forts in Valeria.
 I Maximiana Thaebanorum (the Thebans of Maximianus): comitatensis unit stationed near Thebes, Egypt, and probably fighting in the battle of Adrianople
 I Noricorum (of the Noricans): stationed in Noricum. The legion was probably founded by Diocletian to help defend the Danube.
 I Pontica: the legion was founded by Dioceltian to help defend Pontus Polemoniacus. The legion was stationed in Trapezus.
 Legio II
II Armeniaca
 II Britannica: comitatensis under Magister Peditum
 [[Legio II Flavia Constantia|II Flavia Constantia]]: comitatensis under the command of the Magister Peditum
 II Flavia Virtutis: comitatensis under the command of the Magister Peditum
 II Herculia (devoted to Hercules): levied by Diocletian, stationed in Scythia Minor
 II Isaura
 II Iulia Alpina: pseudocomitatensis under the command of the Magister Peditum, in Comes Illyricum command. It was probably founded by Crispus or Constans. Its objective was to defend Alpes Cottiae
 II Felix Valentis Thebaeorum: comitatensis
 Legio III
 III Diocletiana
 III Flavia Salutis The Legio III Flacia Salutis was a comitatensis legion of the Late Roman Empire. The legion was raised by either Constantius II or Diocletian. The legion was used to guard North Africa. The Legio III Flavia Salutis was under the command of the Magister Militum in the west.
III Herculea: comitatensis under the command of the Comes Illyricum
 III Isaura
 III Iulia Alpina: comitatensis under the command of the Magister Peditum command in Italy
 Legio IV
 IV Italica
 IV Martia
 IV Parthica
 Legio V
 V Iovia  (maybe the Jovians)
 V Parthica
 Legio VI
 VI Gemella
 VI Gallicana
 VI Herculia (maybe the Herculians)
 VI Hispana
 VI Parthica
 Legio XII
 XII Victrix

See also

List of Roman auxiliary regiments
Roman army
Auxilia
Roman legion
Structural history of the Roman military

Notes

References

Primary sources
 Notitia Dignitatum reports the military units and their locations at the beginning of the 5th century.

Secondary sources
 Oxford Classical Dictionary
 Keppie, Lawrence. The Making of the Roman Army, 1984 pp. 205–215
Stephen Dando-Collins "Legions Of Rome"

External links
 Legio X – Legio X Gemina (Equites) – "Viri Clarissimi"
 Livius.org: List of Roman legions
 A catalogue of Roman legions
 Legio V Living History Group in Tennessee
 Roman legions from Dacia (KML file)

 
 
Roman legionary fortresses